Jadi Jantem (English: If I Knew) is a 1974 Indian Bengali-language drama thriller film directed by Tarun Majumdar as Yatrik. This movie was released under the banner of Chitrajug. Uttam Kumar played the role of main protagonist of the movie, Mr. P. K. Basu, Bar-at-law. This movie was based on the thriller novel Nagchampa of Narayan Sanyal.

Plot 
Koushik Mitra, an engineer took a job of taxi driver because he was unable to find an appropriate service. One day he meet with Sujata, a scientist's daughter and they fell in love. Sujata was trapped in a conspiracy where she is accused of a murder. Barrister P. K. Basu defends on behalf of Sujata and starts investigation to find out the real culprit. What follows is a twist to find the actual shooter who killed the infamous Aggarwal.

Cast 
 Uttam Kumar as Barrister P. K. Basu
 Soumitra Chatterjee as Koushik Mitra
 Supriya Devi as Sujata
 Kamal Mitra
 Basanta Choudhury
 Haradhan Bandopadhyay as Government Lawyer
 Ruma Guha Thakurta as Ranu Basu
 Tarun Kumar Chatterjee
 Asit Baran as Sujata's father
 Shailen Mukherjee as Nakul Hui

References

External links
 

1974 films
Bengali-language Indian films
Indian detective films
1970s crime thriller films
1974 crime drama films
1970s mystery thriller films
1970s mystery drama films
1970s Bengali-language films
Indian crime drama films
Indian crime thriller films
Indian thriller drama films
Indian mystery thriller films
Films based on Indian novels
Films based on works by Narayan Sanyal